Carsten Jancker (born 28 August 1974) is a German football coach and former player who is the manager of Austrian club DSV Leoben. He played as a striker for various teams between 1993 and 2009, including FC Köln, Rapid Wien, FC Bayern Munich, Udinese Calcio, FC Kaiserslautern, Shanghai Shenhua F.C., and SV Mattersburg, as well as the German national team.

Club career 

Born in Grevesmühlen, Jancker started his career as a trainee at Hansa Rostock before making his Bundesliga debut in 1993 with 1. FC Köln. At the age of 21, he was transferred to Rapid Vienna, scoring fourteen goals including seven in the UEFA Cup Winners' Cup to finish as the tournament's top scorer. Thanks to this impressive performance, Jancker spent only one season with the Austrian club before being brought back to Germany to play for FC Bayern Munich.

Jancker's time at Bayern between 1996 and 2002 was the best period of his career, a spell which included four Bundesliga titles and victory in the 2001 UEFA Champions League. At Bayern, Jancker was partnered with the Brazilian inside-forward Giovane Élber, often rated as one of the Bundesliga's best attacking players.

Jancker left Bayern for Italian side Udinese in 2002, but the move was not a success; over two seasons and 35 games, the forward registered only two goals. Jancker was said to be "too slow and predictable for Serie A" by one football website. In 2004, Jancker returned to Germany with Kaiserslautern and showed a slight improvement in form, netting five times in 25 games. In 2004, he also scored six goals in Kaiserslautern's 15–0 first round DFB-Pokal win against FC Schönberg 95, still a record for any player in the competition. This was an improvement over his own previous joint record of five, which he had scored for Bayern Munich against DJK Waldberg in the latter's 16–1 first round cup defeat in 1997. Following the relegation of Kaiserslautern in May 2006, Jancker signed for Chinese team Shanghai Shenhua.

After poor performances, he was dropped in October, and agreed to join SV Mattersburg in the winter transfer window. In June 2009 it was announced that Mattersburg did not want to work with Jancker any further because of his physical condition. In February 2010, he announced his retirement at the end of the current season.

International career 

His performances alongside Elber caught the eye of German national coach Erich Ribbeck, who included Jancker in his international squad for Euro 2000.

Instantly recognisable to European football fans, the invariably shaven-headed forward has generally failed to replicate his club form when playing for the national side. A possible explanation for his poorly-regarded international performances might be that the German national team lacked a skilful strike partner in the Élber mould. Whatever the reason, Jancker never impressed for Germany; although he was included in Rudi Völler's squad for the 2002 FIFA World Cup – scoring a goal in the team's opening 8–0 win over Saudi Arabia, he was dropped from the team shortly after the tournament and was never recalled. His German international scoring record stands at roughly a goal every three games. He is known for scoring in Germany's 5–1 defeat to England in 2001.

Style of play 
His height and strength proved to be an advantage when playing as a target man, as displayed during his most successful days at FC Bayern Munich. Jancker was known for being an unusual center forward, being weak in the air despite his huge frame, but showing a surprising control of the ball, especially featuring a polished back-to-the-goal game, good link-up play, and a touch for scoring with his hard right-footed shot – always doing the most intelligent and simple things on the field, courtesy of his awareness. He also struggled with injuries throughout his career.

Coaching career 
On 18 February 2010, the former international striker took over the U14 team of SC Neusiedl. Additionally he works for the first team in the Austrian Regional League East as an individual coach. On 27 April 2010, Jancker announced that he will work as the new coach of the Under 15 of his former club SK Rapid Wien, starting 1 July 2010. In April 2013, he became assistant coach of the club's Austrian Bundesliga team.

Jancker became the head coach of SV Horn in June 2017. He was fired on 28 November 2018.

In April 2019, he was appointed manager of FC Marchfeld Donauauen, starting from 1 May 2019.

On 23 February 2021, Jancker signed with DSV Leoben.

Career statistics

Club

International

International goals
Score and results list Germany's goal tally first.

Honours 

Rapid Wien
 Austrian Bundesliga: 1995–96
 UEFA Cup Winners' Cup runner-up: 1995–96

Bayern Munich
 Bundesliga: 1996–97, 1998–99, 1999–2000, 2000–01
 DFB-Pokal: 1997–98, 1999–2000
 DFB-Ligapokal: 1997, 1998, 1999, 2000
 UEFA Champions League: 2000–01
 Intercontinental Cup: 2001

References

External links 

 
 
 
 Profile at SV Mattersburg  

1974 births
Living people
People from Grevesmühlen
German footballers
Association football forwards
Germany international footballers
Germany under-21 international footballers
Germany youth international footballers
German expatriate footballers
UEFA Euro 2000 players
2002 FIFA World Cup players
FC Hansa Rostock players
1. FC Köln players
SK Rapid Wien players
FC Bayern Munich footballers
Udinese Calcio players
1. FC Kaiserslautern players
SV Mattersburg players
German expatriate sportspeople in China
Shanghai Shenhua F.C. players
Chinese Super League players
Bundesliga players
German expatriate sportspeople in Italy
Austrian Football Bundesliga players
German expatriate sportspeople in Austria
Serie A players
Expatriate footballers in Austria
German football managers
Expatriate footballers in Italy
Expatriate footballers in China
UEFA Champions League winning players
Footballers from Mecklenburg-Western Pomerania
People from Bezirk Rostock
German expatriate football managers
Expatriate football managers in Austria
SV Horn managers
DSV Leoben managers
East German footballers